
Gmina Brzeźnica is a rural gmina (administrative district) in Wadowice County, Lesser Poland Voivodeship, in southern Poland.

Villages
Gmina Brzeźnica contains the villages and settlements of Bachorowice, Bęczyn, Brzezinka, Brzeźnica, Chrząstowice, Kopytówka, Kossowa, Łączany, Marcyporęba, Nowe Dwory, Paszkówka, Sosnowice, Tłuczań and Wyźrał.

Neighbouring gminas
Gmina Brzeźnica is bordered by the gminas of Czernichów, Kalwaria Zebrzydowska, Skawina, Spytkowice and Tomice.

References
Polish official population figures 2006

Brzeznica
Wadowice County